Qods County is in Tehran province, Iran. The capital of the county is the city of Qods. At the 2006 census, the region's population (as Qods District of Shahriar County) was 237,077 in 62,355 households. It was separated from Shahriar County. The following census in 2011 counted 290,663 people in 85,169 households, by which time the district had been separated from the county to become Qods County. At the 2016 census, the county's population was 316,636 in 96,682 households.

Administrative divisions

The population history and structural changes of Qods County's administrative divisions over three consecutive censuses are shown in the following table. The latest census shows one district, two rural districts, and one city.

References

 

Counties of Tehran Province